3rd Street/Jefferson station and 3rd Street/Washington station, collectively known as Convention Center/Ballpark/Arena, are a pair of light rail stations on Valley Metro Rail in Phoenix, Arizona, United States. They are the fifteenth stop westbound and the fourteenth stop eastbound on the initial  rail segment.

Ridership

Nearby attractions
 Phoenix Convention Center
 Phoenix Symphony Hall
 Collier Center
 Footprint Center
 Chase Field
 Sandra Day O'Connor United States Courthouse
 Arizona Science Center
 Heritage Square

References

External links
 Valley Metro map

Valley Metro Rail stations in Phoenix, Arizona
Railway stations in the United States opened in 2008
2008 establishments in Arizona